Richárd Frank (born 28 August 1990) is a Hungarian striker who plays for Pécsi Mecsek FC.

Career statistics

References

External links
 Player profile at HLSZ 
 

1990 births
Living people
Sportspeople from Pécs
Hungarian footballers
Association football forwards
Újpest FC players
MTK Budapest FC players
FC Tatabánya players
Pécsi MFC players
Nemzeti Bajnokság I players
Association football midfielders
Nemzeti Bajnokság II players